Resonance Records is an independent jazz record label established in 2008 as the centerpiece of the Rising Jazz Stars Foundation, a non–profit organization dedicated to preserving the art and legacy of jazz. The label is based in Los Angeles, California and is devoted to preserving jazz and discovering the rising stars of tomorrow. The label's roster includes John Beasley, Bill Cunliffe, Tamir Hendelman, Christian Howes, Kathy Kosins, Andreas Öberg, Marian Petrescu, Claudio Roditi, Donald Vega and others. Resonance Records has also released recordings by John Coltrane, Bill Evans, Gene Harris, Scott LaFaro, Charles Lloyd, Wes Montgomery and Jaco Pastorius .

Rising Jazz Stars Foundation was founded by George Klabin in 2005 in an effort to provide support and assistance to talented jazz artists. It began as a production of performance opportunities for the artists at the Rising Jazz Stars Studio located in Beverly Hills. Klabin provided further support by creating Resonance Records, where all the artists would be assisted in record production, distribution, and performance opportunities. The goals were to "capture brilliant and passionate, magical moments that rise above the average jazz heard on most CDs and, on a more personal level, to be that missing agent for those deserving artists who simply had not received that serendipitous break, leading to proper publication and promotion of their best work".

Awards
 Grammy Award nomination, Best Latin Jazz Album: Claudio Roditi, Brazilliance x4, 2009
 Grammy Award, Best Instrumental Arrangement: Resonance Big Band Plays Tribute to Oscar Peterson, 2009
 Grammy Award nomination, Best Jazz Instrumental Album: John Beasley, Positootly!, 2010
 Grammy Award, Best Album Notes: Ashley Kahn, John Coltrane: Offering, 2015

Discography

References

External links
 Resonance Records Official Site

American record labels
Jazz record labels
Record labels established in 2008
501(c)(3) organizations